Grand Gorge is a hamlet in the town of Roxbury, Delaware County, New York, United States. Grand Gorge has a post office with the ZIP code 12434. It was the location of the Grand Gorge Railroad Station before the railroad station was torn down.

The Mores 

Grand Gorge was originally named "Moresville" after the More family, the first family to settle what is now the town of Roxbury. The family came from Scotland in 1772 and first settled in Harpersfield. On the way they met John Clark, and they traded claims, and John More received the land that is now the Grand Gorge village. Families began to settle the place, and by 1790 the community was well begun. 
John More (February 24, 1745 - January 1, 1840) and his wife Betty Taylor More (1738 - October 13, 1823) had eight children:

John Taylor More (February 27, 1771 - June 23, 1857)
Robert More (July 8, 1772 - February 19, 1849)
Alexander Taylor More (January 5, 1775 - March 11, 1854)
Jonas More (March 22, 1778 - March 5, 1852)
Jean More Smith (April 3, 1780 - June 5, 1861)
James More (January 10, 1782 - May 9, 1866)
David More (January 11, 1786 - November 29, 1873)
Edward Livingston More (August 1, 1788 - August 13, 1867)

From their eight children came 89 grandchildren, and well over 100 great-grandchildren. Today there are 14,000 recorded descendants. Among them are railroad baron Jay Gould, whose mother was a More, and James Hadley Billington, the U.S. Librarian of Congress.

Demographics
As of the 2000 Census, Grand Gorge had a population of 663. The community was not listed as a census-designated place in 2010 and therefore did not have population statistics gathered separately from its parent town of Roxbury.

References 

Hamlets in New York (state)
Hamlets in Delaware County, New York